The 2020–21 season was the 52nd season of competitive association football in Australia.

Several events from March 2020 onwards were disrupted or postponed due to impacts from the COVID-19 pandemic in Australia.

National teams

Australia men's national soccer team

2022 FIFA World Cup qualification / 2023 AFC Asian Cup qualification

Second round

Men's under 23

Friendlies
The following is a list of friendlies played by the men's under 23 national team in 2020–21.

Men's under-20

Friendly

AFC U-19 Championship
The 2020 AFC U-19 Championship was cancelled after the draw for the group stage was conducted.

Men's under-17

AFC U-16 Championship
The 2020 AFC U-16 Championship was cancelled after the draw for the group stage was conducted.

Australia women's national soccer team

Friendlies
The following is a list of friendlies played by the women's senior national team in 2020–21.

AFC competitions

AFC Champions League
All three teams that qualified for the 2021 AFC Champions League – Sydney FC, Melbourne City and Brisbane Roar – withdrew from the competition after the draw.

Men's football

A-League

National Premier Leagues

The competition in all member federations was suspended, effective from 18 March, due to the impacts from the COVID-19 pandemic in Australia. Apart from Victoria, competitions resumed in the various member federations between late June and late July. It was announced on 3 July that the finals series for the 2020 competition had been cancelled.

Cup competitions

FFA Cup

The competition was suspended for one month due to the impacts from the COVID-19 pandemic in Australia, effective 18 March, and  cancelled on 3 July, although the associated Lakoseljac Cup competition in Tasmania recommenced in July.

Women's football

W-League

New clubs
 A-League: Macarthur FC

Deaths
 12 January 2021: Frank Arok, 88, Australian head coach from 1983 to 1989.
 26 January 2021: Jozef Vengloš, 84, Australian head coach in 1967.
 January 2021: Frank Parsons, Australian striker.
 9 March 2021: Alan Marnoch, 77, Australian and Sydney Hakoah defender.
 29 March 2021: Bill Murphy, Australian footballer.
 23 May 2021: Alan Garside, Australian and Granville Kewpies striker.

Retirements
 12 July 2020: Mile Jedinak, 35, former Australia, Sydney United, and Central Coast Mariners midfielder.
 10 August 2020: Oriol Riera, 34, former Western Sydney Wanderers forward.
 12 August 2020: Pirmin Schwegler, 33, former Switzerland and Western Sydney Wanderers midfielder.
 26 August 2020: Daniel Bowles, 28, former Gold Coast United, Adelaide United, and Brisbane Roar defender.
 9 October 2020: Chris Harold, 28, former Gold Coast United, Perth Glory, and Central Coast Mariners forward.
 16 December 2020: Archie Thompson, 42, former Australia, Gippsland Falcons, Carlton, Marconi Stallions, and Melbourne Victory forward.
 December 2020: Rashid Mahazi, 28, former Melbourne Victory and Western Sydney Wanderers midfielder.
 25 March 2021: Rhali Dobson, 28, former Australia, Newcastle Jets, and Melbourne City forward.
 5 June 2021: Andrew Durante, 39, former New Zealand, Sydney Olympic, Parramatta Power, Newcastle Jets, Wellington Phoenix, Sydney FC, and Western United defender.
 11 June 2021: Nigel Boogaard, 34, former Newcastle Jets, Central Coast Mariners, and Adelaide United defender.
 20 June 2021: Mark Milligan, 35, former Australia, Northern Spirit, Sydney FC, Newcastle Jets, Melbourne Victory, and Macarthur FC defender and midfielder.
 29 June 2021: Beñat Etxebarria, 34, former Spain and Macarthur FC midfielder.
 29 June 2021: Markel Susaeta, 33, former Spain, Melbourne City, and Macarthur FC midfielder.

Notes

References

External links
 Football Australia official website

2020 in Australian soccer
2021 in Australian soccer
Seasons in Australian soccer
2020–21 in Australian women's soccer